The Bridge may refer to:

Art, entertainment and media

Art
 The Bridge (sculpture), a 1997 sculpture in Atlanta, Georgia, US
 Die Brücke (The Bridge), a group of German expressionist artists
 The Bridge (M. C. Escher), a lithograph print by M. C. Escher

Books and publications

 "The Bridge" (short story), a short story by Franz Kafka written in 1916
 The Bridge (long poem), a 1930 modernist poem by Hart Crane
 Die Brücke (novel) (The Bridge), a 1958 West German anti-war novel by Manfred Gregor
 The Bridge, 1960 children's book by Charlton Osborn, illustrated by Evaline Ness
 The Bridge (novel), published in 1986 by Iain Banks
 The Bridge (short story collection), published in 1986 by Zayd Mutee' Dammaj
 The Bridge, 1991 novel by John Skipp and Craig Spector
 The Bridge (journal), a National Academy of Engineering journal covering roles of engineering in society which began publication in 1996
 The Bridge (2000 novel) by Janine Ellen Young, nominated for a 2000 Philip K. Dick Award 
 The Bridge: The Life and Rise of Barack Obama, a 2010 biography
 The Bridge, a 2012 novel by Karen Kingsbury

Film and TV

Films
 De brug (The Bridge), a 1928 documentary short directed by Joris Ivens, of a vertical lift railway bridge
 The Bridge (1929 film), aka The Spy, a short silent film directed by Charles Vidor
 Die Brücke (film) (The Bridge), a 1959 World War II film directed by Bernhard Wicki based on the novel of the same name
 The Bridge (1969 film) (also called Most), directed by Yugoslav director Hajrudin Krvavac
 The Bridge (1992 film), based on the novel by Maggie Hemingway
 The Bridge Celebration, aka The Bridge, a 1997 short film directed by Peter Greenaway
 The Bridge (2003 film), directed by Bobby Garabedian, written and produced by William Zabka
 The Bridge (2006 documentary film), a documentary about individuals who died by suicide at the Golden Gate Bridge in 2004
 The Bridge (2006 drama film), a fictional story of involvement and disillusionment with Scientology
 Karen Kingsbury's The Bridge,  a two-part TV movie, based on the novel by Karen Kingsbury released in 2015 and 2016.
 The Bridge (2017 film), directed by Kunle Afolayan

Television
 The Bridge (2005 TV series), an American documentary television series and community show chronicling old-school hip hop on NYCTV
 The Bridge (Canadian TV series), a 2010 Canadian police drama television series
 The Bridge (2011 TV series), a Danish–Swedish police television drama of four series (2011–2018)
 The Bridge (2013 TV series), a 2013 American series based on the Danish–Swedish television series
 The Bridge (Russian TV series), a 2017 Russian series based on the Danish–Swedish television series
 The Bridge (2018 TV series), a 2018 Malaysian series based on the Danish–Swedish television series 
 "The Bridge" (Agents of S.H.I.E.L.D.), an episode
 "The Bridge" (The Handmaid's Tale), an episode
 "The Bridge" (The Walking Dead), an episode
 El Puente (TV series) ("The Bridge"), a 2017 Spanish reality television series
 The Bridge: Le Trésor de Patagonie (TV series), a 2019 French series based on the Spanish series
 The Bridge (British TV series), a 2020 British series based on the Spanish series
 A Ponte: The Bridge Brasil (TV series), a 2022 Brasilian series based on the Spanish series
 The Bridge Australia (TV series), a 2022 Australian series based on the Spanish series

Music

Artists
 The Bridge (band), a jam band from Baltimore, Maryland, US
 The Bridgeheads, a Slovak band formerly called The Bridge
 The Bridge, early 1970s alternative name of The Brooklyn Bridge

Albums
 The Bridge (Sonny Rollins album), 1962
 The Bridge, a 1979 album by Thomas Leer and Robert Rental
 The Bridge (Billy Joel album), 1986
 The Bridge: A Tribute to Neil Young, 1989 anthology album 
 The Bridge (Ace of Base album), 1995
 The Bridge (Letter Kills album), 2004
 The Bridge (Concept of a Culture), a 2009 album by Grandmaster Flash
 The Bridge (Melanie Fiona album), 2009
 The Bridge (Sting album), a 2021 album

Songs
 "The Bridge", a song by Dolly Parton on her 1968 album Just Because I'm a Woman
 "The Bridge", a song by Neil Young on his 1973 album Time Fades Away
 "The Bridge", a song by Janis Ian on her 1978 self-titled album
 "The Bridge" (Deane Waretini song), 1981
 "The Bridge", a song by MC Shan, on his 1987 album Down by Law
 "The Bridge" (Elton John song), 2006
 "The Bridge", a song by Train on their 2014 album Bulletproof Picasso
 “The Bridge”, a song by Sting on his 2021 album of the same name

Radio
 The Bridge (Sirius XM), a satellite radio channel devoted to soft rock music
 KTBG, a listener supported radio station in Warrensburg, Missouri, US, known as The Bridge
 Black Country Radio, a community radio station in England, formerly known as 102.5 The Bridge

Other art and entertainment
 The Bridge (video game), a 2013 video game

Places
 The Bridge, a multi-purpose sports and arts centre in Easterhouse, a suburb of Glasgow, Scotland
 The Bridge, a village centre in St. Sampson, Guernsey
 The Bridge (Phnom Penh), skyscraper in Phnom Penh, Cambodia
 The Bridge Peer Counseling Center, at Stanford University, US
 Bridgestone Arena, a sports arena in Nashville, Tennessee, USA, commonly referred to as “The Bridge”
 Die Brücke (institute), an institute founded in Munich, Germany
 Queensbridge Houses, a public housing development in Queens, US referenced in various hip-hop songs as "the Bridge"
 Stamford Bridge (stadium), home of Chelsea F.C., in England, often referred to as "The Bridge"

Other uses
 The Bridge to Total Freedom, a concept in Scientology, sometimes abbreviated to simply "The Bridge"
 The Bridge (Croatia), political party

See also
 Bridge (disambiguation)
 Bridges (disambiguation)